Apobaetis is a genus of mayflies in the family Baetidae. It contains at least six species.

Species
 Apobaetis etowah
 Apobaetis fiuzai
 Apobaetis futilis, western hatch.
 Apobaetis indeprensus
 Apobaetis lakota
 Apobaetis signifer
et al.

References

Mayfly genera